The Apache Raider is a 1928 American silent Western film directed by Leo D. Maloney and starring Maloney, Eugenia Gilbert and Tom London.

Cast
 Leo D. Maloney as 'Apache' Bob 
 Eugenia Gilbert as Dixie Stillwell 
 Don Coleman as Dal Cartwright 
 Tom London as Griffin Dawson 
 Jack Ganzhorn as 'Breed' Artwell 
 Frederick Dana as 'Bit' Ward 
 Joan Renee as Juanita Wharton 
 Merrill McCormick as Ray Wharton 
 Robert Smith as 'Beaze' La Mare 
 Walter Shumway as 'Fang' Jaccard 
 Murdock MacQuarrie as Don Felix Beinal 
 Whitehorse as Ed Stillwell

References

External links
 

1928 films
1928 Western (genre) films
Films directed by Leo D. Maloney
American black-and-white films
Pathé Exchange films
Silent American Western (genre) films
1920s English-language films
1920s American films